Tegostoma comparalis is a species of moth in the family Crambidae. It was described by Jacob Hübner in 1796. It is found in Spain, France, Italy, Croatia, North Macedonia, Greece, Bulgaria, Romania, Ukraine, Kyrgyzstan, North Africa, India, Pakistan, the Near East, Turkmenistan, the United Arab Emirates, Yemen, South Africa and Niger.

The larvae feed on Salsola kali and Tribulus terrestris.

References

Moths described in 1796
Moths of Europe
Moths of Africa
Moths of Asia
Odontiini
Taxa named by Jacob Hübner